IBT Media is an American global digital news organization with over 90 million monthly readers, owned by followers of religious leader David Jang.
It publishes the International Business Times and Medical Daily, among others. IBT Media is headquartered in New York City, in the Hanover Square neighborhood of Lower Manhattan. As of 2014, the company posted revenue of about $21 million and generated a profit of about $500,000.

Overview
Founded as IBT Media in 2006, the company has several brands that it has built organically through specialty vertical sites and also international editions.

IBT Media focuses on online publication.

Corporate structure and revenue
IBT Media is a privately held company, formerly owned by Etienne Uzac and Johnathan Davis. The company has not received outside funding, and has grown with a focus on being an "efficient company", concentrating on the "revenue side as well as on the expenses".

It started in 2006, with personal savings, an SBA bank loan, and no input, financial or advisory, from VCs. It has been profitable since 2010.

It has also grown through the acquisition of Newsweek.

The company derives its profits primarily from advertising and has been profitable since 2010. It says it has recently undertaken new ventures to become a "multi-product global media group" and to diversify capital, including adopting Newsweeks subscription models across its properties, and launching a new business-to-business arm.

On September 14, 2018, after completing the strategic structural changes initially announced in March, IBT Media spun off into two separate companies—Newsweek and IBT Media.

Partnerships

IBT Media says it has an ongoing "working relationship" with Olivet University which includes the school providing design assistance and computer resources, and IBT Media providing internships for students. It characterizes it as similar to the relationships Silicon Valley companies have with local universities. However, publication Christianity Today alleges that IBT Media has a close relationship both with Olivet and with its founder, controversial evangelical pastor David J. Jang. It claims that Jang is an investor in and has exercised control over IBT Media, that Davis was formerly director of journalism at Olivet, and that Uzac was its treasurer, at least at one time. Executives characterize the relationship as between the institutions and not the founders, and that it was purely operational.

IBT Media is part of Economist's "Ideas Channel", an ad-network based on mindset rather than demographics, set up in part to reach "an intellectual and often influential audience interested in business, politics and science". The company's Bizu video platform partners with IDG Communications and France 24. for content, and Digitas and PJA Advertising and others for monetization of the platform.

The company's brands publish to a number of 3rd party platforms, including Flipboard, Zite, and The Washington Post's Social Reader.

Controversies
In January 2018 Manhattan District Attorney staff raided the company's offices, taking away eighteen computer servers, in what Newsweek reported was part of an investigation into company finances. On 1 February 2018 co-owner and chairman, Etienne Uzac, and his wife Marion Kim who acted as finance director, resigned. Uzac was convicted, pleading guilty to avoid jail time.

On February 20, 2018, Newsweek reported on the DA's investigation into its parent company, and its relationship with Olivet University.<ref name=nw-20180220>{{cite news |url=http://www.newsweek.com/newsweek-manhattan-da-olivet-university-david-jang-fired-new-york-media-813949 |title=Why Is the Manhattan DA Looking at Newsweek'''s Ties to a Christian University? |first1=Celeste|last1=Katz|first2=Josh|last2=Keefe|first3=Josh|last3=Saul |newspaper=Newsweek |date=20 February 2018 |access-date=22 February 2018}}</ref>

Following the publication of the story, several Newsweek staff were fired and some editors threatened to resign stating that management had tried to interfere in the story's publication (veteran IBT journalist Matthew Cooper did resign). On October 10, 2018, it was reported by the Wall Street Journal that IBT Media was charged with defrauding lenders.

On June 30, 2022, the New York State Education Department officially ended Olivet's authorization to operate in the state citing that their failings "are part of a larger pattern of poor administration and addressing such problems only after being caught in a criminal conspiracy."

On July 6, 2022, a lawsuit was filed in New York state by Newsweek’s current owner, NW Media Holdings Corp., seeking to enforce IBT’s “contractual obligation to indemnify NW Media Holdings for the multi-million-dollar losses incurred as a result of IBT’s former mismanagement of Newsweek.” The lawsuit also the lawsuit names several defendants in addition to IBT Media, a company that owned Newsweek until 2018, including religious leader David Jang and Etienne Uzac, a former CEO and chairman of Newsweek. Additional lawsuits have been filed by Newsweek co-owners Johnathan Davis and Dev Pragad against each other, alleging various grievances including stolen trade secrets, records falsification and reputational damage.

Innovations

IBT Media had run on a proprietary content management system that it has built over several years, though based on examination of the HTML source, it currently runs Drupal. The company started to tie-in real-time analytics into the newsroom as early as 2010, and based on those results, optimize follow-up content, positioning, and editorial calendars to serve readers. Social feedback is also built into the newsroom.

The company has also created platforms for content. Bizu, a video platform for business professionals hosts content and also offers incremental revenue streams to content providers.

 Assets International Business Times – global business and economic news, in seven languages across ten editionsMedical Daily – medical news siteLatin Times – Latin American-oriented news siteiDigitalTimes (now Player One) – technology and digital media news site

 Chronology 
 2006 – International Business Times incorporates in New York.
 2008–2010 – IBTimes launches specialty verticals: Jobs, Health, Real Estate, Education and Travel.
 2011 – IBTimes moves into Newsweeks old offices after 1,200% growth for the year.
 2012 – International Business Times reincorporates as IBT Media, the new parent company to IBTimes, and launches Bizu, a video web portal and platform.
 2013 – Medical Daily, HollywoodTake, and Latin Times are launched.
 2013 – Newsweek is acquired.
 2014 – Newsweek returns to print, and the Newsweek operations becomes profitable
 2017 – Company rebrands as Newsweek Media Group.
 2018 – Newsweek is spun off into a separate legal entity.
 2018 – Company rebrands back to IBT Media after separating from Newsweek''.
2020 – Former owner Etienne Uzac pleads guilty to money laundering and fraud.

References

External links
 

 
Internet properties established in 2006
2006 establishments in New York City